Danieli Haloten is a journalist, actress and lecturer especially noted for being the first blind actress in the world to play a major role in a Brazilian soap opera Caras & Bocas broadcast by the Globo Network.

Early years
Haloten was born on February 21, 1980, in Curitiba the capital of Paraná, in the south of Brazil. Haloten was born with a sight deficiency, caused by glaucoma and lost the vision of her left eye during surgery, at the age of ten. Gradually, she began to lose the vision in her other eye and by the age of 17 had become blind.

Haloten majored in Journalism in PUCPR (Catholic Pontifice University of Parana), and Performing Arts in UFPR (Federal University of Parana). Even in TV Globo, she worked as a reporter in "Video show" and "Fantástico", with journalist Caco Barcellos. She has done internships on radio, for newspapers and government departments as a journalist. One of the newspapers was "Folha de S.Paulo", the biggest journal in Latin America.

Since Haloten was a child, she always performed in theater and dreamed of working on TV. Her first job in television was on a TV show where she presented live, on Commentary TV, in 1999. After this experience, she looked for sponsors and created, produced and presented "Danieli Multishow", on Band TV. It was a show with interviews and music, showing in 2000.

While Haloten studied Journalism, she created and presented "Faro": a TV Show where she sniffed around for news with her guide dog. The project, still unedited, won first place on the "Sangue novo" prize offered by Parana Journalists Association, competing with students from all the states in Brazil.

Breakthrough Role 
Haloten is perhaps best known for playing Anita in the soap opera titled "Caras & Bocas", written by Walcyr Carrasco and directed by Jorge Fernando, working with such renowned actors as Ary Fontoura and Beth Mendes. The TV show was broadcast in Brazil between April 2009 and January 2010, by TV Globo, a world leader in soap opera production. The show was also broadcast in many European and Latin countries, under the title: "Aquarela del Amor".

Anita began just as a minor role as the protagonist's sister, but with each episode, she became more popular with viewers and received critical acclaim. "Caras & Bocas" broke audience records in Brazil and Haloten enjoyed a starring role in a majority of the major scenes. The writers of the show noticed Haloten's talent for acting and as she continued to get a warm reception from the public, more importance was given to her character. In just one season in this soap opera she had opportunity to play a variety of scenes, achieving in such a short period what would normally take an entire career for most actors.

When Haloten starred in this major Brazilian Soap Opera, she became big news and was invited as a guest on almost every Brazilian talk show for such major networks as TV Globo and others such as "Programa da Hebe", on SBT, which is one of the most important Brazilian TV host programs. Haloten also wrote the plays "Visita indesejada" and "Direito de enxergar". When Haloten starred in a Soap-Opera, she became big news in every Brazilian broadcast.

Anita Batista da Silva 
At the beginning, Anita was a good girl, protected by her brother Gabriel, played by Mlvino Salvador. Throughout the story, she challenged her role in the family, seeking to have own her job, and also to start dating with Anselmo. At her engagement party, she discovered that her boyfriend had lied to her about everything. It was Anita's first big scene and also the first audience record of "Caras & Bocas". Another scene that caught the attention of the public was at Anita's honeymoon, when her husband had an accident in the forest, and Anita went there by herself, without a cane. While looking for help, she is walking by the river and is attacked by a serpent.
  
As the challenges went on, Anita became more mature, became the family's adviser, had a son and finally, had to deal with the kidnapping of her baby. People still talk about this scene and recognize her great work.

Raising Awareness 
In 2011, Haloten starred in her first comedy set called "Danieli Haloten: Nua e Crua", written by her. Haloten also wrote the plays "Visita indesejada" and "Direito de enxergar". 
Nowadays, Haloten give speeches about inclusion of disabilities, motivation and career success and actively seeking for new opportunities to work on TV as a reporter, TV hostess or actress.

Nowadays, Haloten gives speeches about inclusion of disabilities, motivation and career success and is still looking for an opportunity to work on TV as a reporter, TV hostess or actress. 
Haloten was born with sight deficiency, caused by Glaucoma and lose the vision of her left eye during surgery, when she was ten years old. After this, she began to lose the vision in her other eye and by the age of 17 had become blind.

It was Anita's first big scene and also the first audience record of "Caras & Bocas". Another scene that caught the attention of the public was at Anita's honeymoon, when her husband had an accident in the forest, and Anita went there by herself, without a cane. While looking for help, she is walking by the river and is attacked by a serpent. The challenges went on. Anita became more mature, became the family's adviser, had a son and finally, had to deal with the kidnapping of her baby. People still talk about this scene and recognize her great work. 
 
Haloten majored in Journalism in PUCPR (Catholic Pontifice University of Parana), and Performing Arts in UFPR (Federal University of Parana). Even in TV Globo, she worked as a reporter in "Video show" and "Fantástico", with journalist Caco Barcellos.

She has done an internship on radio, for newspapers and government departments as a journalist. One of these papers was "Folha de S.Paulo", the biggest journal of Latin America. Haloten was born in 1980, February 21, in Curitiba the capital of Paraná, in the south of Brasil. While Haloten studied Journalism, she created and presented "Faro": a TV Show where she sniffed around for news with her guide dog. The project, still unedited, won first place on the "Sangue novo" prize offered by Parana Journalists Association, competing with students from all the states in Brazil.  
 
Since Haloten was a child, she wished to work on TV. She always performed in theater. Her first job in television was on a TV show where she presented live, on Community TV, in 1999. After this experience, she looked for sponsors and created, produced and presented "Danieli Multishow", on Band TV. It was a show with interviews and music, showing in 2000. In 2011, Haloten starred in her first stand-up comedy set called "Danieli Haloten: Nua e Crua", written by her.

References

Sources
 https://web.archive.org/web/20120105061720/http://veja.abril.com.br/120809/estrela-escuro-p-158.shtml

External links
 https://www.youtube.com/watch?v=3WRiKs4afmM
 https://www.youtube.com/watch?v=21yC0-bXMtE
 https://www.youtube.com/watch?v=rFxI-1rkLpQ
 https://www.youtube.com/watch?v=KkhvX3s9nhE
 https://www.youtube.com/watch?v=F12-2LeNGgw

1980 births
Brazilian blind people
Blind actors
Brazilian journalists
Brazilian soap opera actresses
People from Curitiba
Living people